Ernest Robert Stewart (5 November 1874 – 25 March 1946) was an Australian rules footballer who played with St Kilda in the Victorian Football Association (VFA) and Victorian Football League (VFL).

References

External links 

1874 births
1946 deaths
Australian rules footballers from Melbourne
St Kilda Football Club players
People from St Kilda, Victoria